"Rhapsody in the Rain" is a song written by Twyla Herbert and Lou Christie and performed by Christie with backing vocals by The Delicates.  It reached No. 10 on Canada's RPM 100, No. 16 on the Billboard Hot 100, No. 37 on the UK's Record Retailer chart, and No. 40 in Australia in 1966. It was featured on his 1966 album, Painter of Hits.

The song was produced and arranged by Charlie Calello.

Many radio stations banned the song due to the controversial lyrics.  MGM had Christie re-record the song's opening lyrics to release a "clean" version.

In popular culture
Both the official Super Bowl XLI highlight film and an NFL's Greatest Games episode about that game took their title from this song.

References

1966 songs
1966 singles
Songs written by Twyla Herbert
Songs written by Lou Christie
Lou Christie songs
MGM Records singles